Manal Naharam is a 2015 Indian Tamil-language film written and produced by M.I.Vasanthkumar and directed by Shankar Panikkar starring Prajin Padmanabhan, Gautham, Tejaswini Prakash, Varuna Shetty, Vinod Kumar (VK), Jaise Jose, Jijesh Menon and Shankar himself.

The film, a bi-lingual, was made in Malayalam as  Sand City  and released on 2 January 2015. Manal Naharam was released on 27 February 2015.

Summary and Plot

Manal Naharam explores the stories of young Indians who travel to Dubai for better jobs and futures, leaving behind their families.  The movie deals with friendship and romance.

Mansur (Prajin), a sales commission agent in Dubai is in love with Poornima (Tanishka), a waitress at a restaurant. Anand (Gautham), in search of a job, is loved by Nisha (Varuna Shetty), the daughter of business tycoon Ibrahim Rabbani (Shankar). James (Jaise Jose), the third person in the group, gets into trouble that complicates things for everyone.

Cast

Prajin - Manzoor
Gautham - Aanand
Tejaswini Prakash - Thanishka
Varuna Shetty - Nisha
Vinod Kumar (VK) - Mohan Raj
Jaise Jose - James
Jijesh Menon - Noushad
Sakshi Sharma - Fathima
Rex George
"Engal Aasan" Raamki - Gopalakrishnan
Dubai Kannan
"Caravan" Arunachalam
"Kaadhal" Saravanan
Muraliraman
Rajesh B
Master Ashwanth 
Shankar Panikkar - Ibrahim Rabbani

Production

Development

Shankar was impressed by the story line given by his friend Muraliraman from Dubai. M.I.Vasanthkumar wrote the screenplay and produced the film.  A talent hunt was organized for the audition and the actors were selected.

Casting

Gautham Krishin, who played the lead in Malayalam language film Yakshiyum Njanum directed by Vinayan and Prajin Padmanabhan, was offered the lead role. Tejaswini Prakash, an actress from Kannada language films Savi Savi Nenapu and the unreleased Asokavana was signed up as leading lady. Newcomer Varuna Shetty and Narayana Kannan from Dubai are supported by actors Jaise Jose and Jijesh Menon.

Renil Gowtham, the music director of Shankar' s directorial debut Virus was signed for music department, while J.Sreedhar, who has worked on Challenge 2 was assigned the cinematography.

Filming

The preliminary schedule of the film took place in Chennai in March 2013, before the crew left for the remainder of the shooting in Dubai. "The 50-day shooting was very tough and challenging", said Shankar.

Music

Manal Naharam 's audio was launched on 14 July 2014 at RKV Studios, Chennai attended by the cast of both Manal Naharam and the team of the directors first Tamil feature Oru Thalai Ragam as they celebrated the 34 year reunion of that film's release. Roopa, Shankar, Thyagu, Kailash, cameraman Rajasekhar (Rajasekhar-Robert) and T. Rajendar spoke on the occasion. The film's first look was released in the Tamil portal behindwoods.com. Sand City 's audio was launched on 15 October at The Oberoi, Dubai attended by the entire cast and crew of Sand City. Apart from the team, actor Rizabawa also spoke on the occasion.

Tamil Soundtrack

Malayalam Soundtrack

Film reviews

Maalai Malar gave 71 marks out of 100 for Manal Naharam appreciating the film as attractive. They lauded director Shankar's effort in presenting the film in a touching manner. The technical side of the film, especially songs, cinematography, background score and dialogues were also appreciated. Thanishka and Varuna Shetty along with villain actor Vinod Kumar (VK) and Prajin' s performances were commended. Malini Mannath of The New Indian Express praised the screenplay, acting and the direction in Shankar's Tamil directorial debut.

A critic from The Times of India rated the movie as average and appreciated the photography of the film, summing up as "the film could have been much better if treated well". Movietoday appreciated Sand City as an example of a film which has been dedicated to the Gulf Malayalees. The technical aspect of the film like cinematography, songs and stunning visuals was aptly praised. They recommended the film for the realistic picturisation of Gulf and the life of Gulf Malayalees and rated 3.25/5 stars. Onlookersmedia too appreciated the film summing it as "Sand city is a one time watchable small film for film lovers". Muyals.com praised director Shankar Panicker mentioning that "he needs a good applause as he created a good film with good theme and a group of talented youths. Sand City will mark Shankar Panicker’s name in the list of good directors" and summed up as "Overall the film stands as a watchable one with a good story and presentation; consisting lots of positive factors in it".

References

External links 
 
 

2015 films
2010s Tamil-language films
2010s Malayalam-language films
Films shot in Dubai
Films shot in Chennai
Indian multilingual films
2015 multilingual films